Idalberto Raúl Mederos Sosa (born 8 August 1967) is a Cuban football coach, who most recently managed Cuba.

Managerial career
Mederos managed Cuban club Villa Clara, winning the 2016 Campeonato Nacional de Fútbol de Cuba.

In 2016, Mederos became manager of Cuba.

References

1967 births
Living people
Cuba national football team managers
Cuban football managers
2019 CONCACAF Gold Cup managers